True to Life is a 1943 film directed by George Marshall and starring Mary Martin and Franchot Tone. The film features three songs by Hoagy Carmichael with lyrics by Johnny Mercer.

Plot
Writers Fletcher Marvin and Link Ferris must improve their scripts for a radio drama or face the wrath of their sponsor. Going in different directions, Fletcher heads to "bright lights and lovely ladies", while Link meets the Porter family and falls in love with their daughter, Bonnie.

Cast
Mary Martin as Bonnie Porter
Franchot Tone as Fletcher Marvin
Dick Powell as Link Ferris
Victor Moore as Pop Porter
Mabel Paige as Mom Porter

References

External links

1943 films
Films directed by George Marshall
Films scored by Victor Young
American comedy films
1943 comedy films
American black-and-white films
1940s American films